Zoho Office Suite is an Indian web-based online office suite containing word processing, spreadsheets, presentations, databases, note-taking, wikis, web conferencing, customer relationship management (CRM), project management, invoicing and other applications. It is developed by Zoho Corporation.

History 
Zoho Office Suite was launched in 2005 with a web-based word processor. Additional products such as spreadsheets and presentations, were incorporated later into Zoho. Zoho applications are distributed as software as a service (SaaS).

Zoho uses an open application programming interface  for its Writer, Sheet, Show, Creator, Meeting, and Planner products. It also has plugins into Microsoft Word and Excel, an OpenOffice.org plugin, and a plugin for Firefox.

Zoho Sites is an online, drag and drop website builder. It provides web hosting, unlimited storage, bandwidth and web pages. Features also include an array of website templates and mobile websites.

Zoho CRM  is a customer relationship management application with features like procurement, inventory, and some accounting functions from the realm of ERP. The free version is limited to 10 users.

In October 2009, Zoho integrated some of their applications with the Google Apps online suite.  This enabled users to sign into both suites under one login. Zoho and Google still remain separate, competing companies.

In 2020, Zoho Workplace won Rank 1 in the Indian government's 'Atmanirbhar Bharat App Innovation challenge' in Office category while Zoho Invoice, Books & Expense won Rank 1 in business category.

References

Remote desktop
Remote administration software
Project management software
Web applications
Online office suites
Zoho
Web hosting
Web development software
Human resource management software
Customer relationship management software
Accounting software
Collaborative software
Bug and issue tracking software
Help desk software
Business intelligence software
Reporting software
Business intelligence companies
Data analysis software
Web conferencing
Communication software
Remote desktop software for Linux
Remote control